The 1969 Maryland gubernatorial special election was not a direct election, but a vote in the Maryland General Assembly to determine who would assume the governorship of Maryland after Spiro Agnew's resignation, following his election to the U.S. vice presidency.

At this time Maryland didn't have a position of lieutenant governor, and state law did not designate a person who would assume the office of governor in case of vacancy (unlike most states, when there is always a designated person such as lieutenant governor, Senate President or Secretary of State).

In case of vacancy, the General Assembly would choose a governor.

In 1969 the Assembly had a Democratic majority, so it was clear that Republican Agnew's successor would be a Democrat.

The election was held on January 7, 1969. State representative Marvin Mandel was elected governor. He took office that same day, upon Agnew's resignation.

Candidates
 State Senator William S. James (D)
 State Representative Francis X. Gallagher (D)
 State Representative Marvin Mandel (D)
 U.S. Representative Rogers Morton (R)

Vote
 Mandel (D) – 126 (70.00%):
 Morton (R) – 26 (14.44%)
 Gallagher (D) – 15 (8.33%)
 James (D) – 13 (7.22%)

Although there were three Democrats and only one Republican on the ballot, Mandel was elected easily. He was elected in regular direct election in 1970 and re-elected in 1974.

References

1969
Maryland
Gubernatorial
Maryland special gubernatorial election
Maryland 1969